The canton of Hérisson is a former administrative division in central France. It was disbanded following the French canton reorganisation which came into effect in March 2015. It consisted of 17 communes, which joined the canton of Huriel in 2015. It had 8,955 inhabitants (2012).

The canton comprised the following communes:

Audes
Bizeneuille
Le Brethon
Cosne-d'Allier
Estivareilles
Givarlais
Hérisson
Louroux-Bourbonnais
Louroux-Hodement
Maillet
Nassigny
Reugny
Saint-Caprais
Sauvagny
Tortezais
Vallon-en-Sully
Venas

Demographics

See also
Cantons of the Allier department

References

Former cantons of Allier
2015 disestablishments in France
States and territories disestablished in 2015